Parapercis macrophthalma, the narrow barred grubfish, is a fish species in the sandperch family, Pinguipedidae. It is found in Japan and Taiwan. This species can reach a length of  TL.

This fish was first described by Viktor Pietschmann in 1911 as Neopercis macrophthalma, but in 2013 was assigned to the genus, Parapercis.

References

Pinguipedidae
Taxa named by Viktor Pietschmann
Fish described in 1911